Skyrider Flugschule is a German aircraft manufacturer based in Wernberg-Köblitz, Bavaria. The company specializes in the design and manufacture of ultralight trikes.

In addition to aircraft construction the company also operates a flight training school and collaborates with Ramphos in the design and development of amphibious aircraft. The Skyrider Sonic's trike structure is used in the Ramphos Trident amphibious trike.

The company's trike designs utilize some unusual construction methods. The Skyrider Sonic uses a stainless steel structure and a Smart Car powerplant, while the Skyrider Stingray is built from welded square steel tubing.

Aircraft

References

External links

Aircraft manufacturers of Germany
Ultralight trikes